Tajudeen Agunbiade is a Nigerian para table tennis player of class 9 and Paralympian.

Career 

He represented Nigeria at the 2000 Summer Paralympics held in Sydney, Australia and he competed in table tennis. He won the gold medal at the Men's singles 9 event. He also won the gold medal at the team event together with Tunde Adisa and Femi Alabi.

He also competed at the Men's individual – Class 9–10 and the Men's team – Class 9–10 events at the 2008 Summer Paralympics but did not win a medal.

In July 2019, he won gold at the 2019 ITTF African Para Table Tennis Championships which meant that he qualified to represent Nigeria at the 2020 Summer Paralympics in Tokyo, Japan. He won one of the bronze medals in the men's team C9-10 event.

Achievements

References

External links 
 
 Tajudeen Agunbiade, ITTF Para Table Tennis

Living people
Year of birth missing (living people)
Place of birth missing (living people)
Nigerian male table tennis players
Table tennis players at the 2000 Summer Paralympics
Table tennis players at the 2008 Summer Paralympics
Table tennis players at the 2020 Summer Paralympics
Paralympic table tennis players of Nigeria
Medalists at the 2000 Summer Paralympics
Medalists at the 2020 Summer Paralympics
Paralympic gold medalists for Nigeria
Paralympic bronze medalists for Nigeria
Paralympic medalists in table tennis
20th-century Nigerian people
21st-century Nigerian people